Marcellin Achille Anani Junior (born 27 December 1994), commonly known as Achille Anani, is an Ivorian professional footballer who plays as a forward for French  club Red Star.

Career
Born in Aboisso-Comoé, Anani spent his early years at Aubervilliers and CFFP, before joining Marseille to complete his formation. He made eight appearances and scored two goals for the youth setup in the NextGen Series (2011–13). Simultaneously, Anani featured for Marseille's reserves in the CFA 2. He was eventually promoted to the senior squad in 2012, being an unused substitute in official matches on several occasions.

In June 2014, after leaving Marseille, Anani was linked with Austrian club Red Bull Salzburg, but the deal never went through. He subsequently went on trial with Serbian top-flight club Radnički Niš in early 2015, but failed to get a contract. In the summer of 2015, Anani signed with Serbian second-tier club Dinamo Vranje. He appeared in seven games and scored twice for the side, before leaving after just a few months.

In early 2017, after being without a club for more than a year, Anani returned to France and joined CFA 2 side Aubagne. In October he left Aubagne and signed for Marseille Endoume in the now renamed Championnat National 3.

On 31 May 2019, Anani joined Bourg-en-Bresse.

On 9 August 2022, Anani signed with Red Star.

References

External links

 
 

Living people
1994 births
People from Lagunes District
Association football forwards
Ivorian footballers
Championnat National 3 players
Serbian First League players
Olympique de Marseille players
FK Dinamo Vranje players
US Marseille Endoume players
Football Bourg-en-Bresse Péronnas 01 players
Grenoble Foot 38 players
Red Star F.C. players
Ivorian expatriate footballers
Expatriate footballers in France
Expatriate footballers in Serbia
Ivorian expatriate sportspeople in France
Ivorian expatriate sportspeople in Serbia